Crepidogaster is a genus of beetles in the family Carabidae, containing the following 106 species:

 Crepidogaster aethiopica Basilewsky, 1988
 Crepidogaster algoa (Basilewsky, 1959)
 Crepidogaster alticola (Basilewsky, 1988)
 Crepidogaster ambreana Deuve & Mateu, 1987
 Crepidogaster amieti Deuve, 2005
 Crepidogaster angolana Basilewsky, 1959
 Crepidogaster arnoldi (Basilewsky, 1959)
 Crepidogaster atrata Peringuey, 1899
 Crepidogaster aurasia Basilewsky, 1959
 Crepidogaster bambusicola (Basilewsky, 1988)
 Crepidogaster basilewskyi Deuve & Mateu, 1987
 Crepidogaster bimaculata Boheman, 1848
 Crepidogaster bioculata Chaudoir, 1878
 Crepidogaster bruncki Basilewsky, 1959
 Crepidogaster caeca (Basilewsky, 1959)
 Crepidogaster caffra Peringuey, 1896
 Crepidogaster celsa (Basilewsky, 1988)
 Crepidogaster cicatricosa Liebke, 1934
 Crepidogaster confusa (Basilewsky, 1959)
 Crepidogaster costata (Dejean, 1831)
 Crepidogaster damarensis Peringuey, 1896
 Crepidogaster decolorata Basilewsky, 1959
 Crepidogaster delineata (Basilewsky, 1959)
 Crepidogaster deuvei (Basilewsky, 1988)
 Crepidogaster didyma Basilewsky, 1959
 Crepidogaster diluta Basilewsky, 1959
 Crepidogaster dirrupta (Basilewsky, 1988)
 Crepidogaster dissimilis Basilewsky, 1959
 Crepidogaster dolini Deuve, 2005
 Crepidogaster dollmani Liebke, 1934
 Crepidogaster elegantula Basilewsky, 1988
 Crepidogaster elongata Brancsik, 1893
 Crepidogaster endroedyi Basilewsky, 1988
 Crepidogaster ferruginea Basilewsky, 1988
 Crepidogaster fortesculpta (Basilewsky, 1959)
 Crepidogaster franzi Deuve & Mateu, 1987
 Crepidogaster funerula (Basilewsky, 1992)
 Crepidogaster garambae (Basilewsky, 1959)
 Crepidogaster grossa Liebke, 1934
 Crepidogaster hessei Basilewsky, 1959
 Crepidogaster holtzi Liebke, 1934
 Crepidogaster horni Dupuis, 1914
 Crepidogaster humerata Chaudoir, 1876
 Crepidogaster humicola (Basilewsky, 1959)
 Crepidogaster infuscata (Dejean, 1825)
 Crepidogaster insignis Peringuey, 1896
 Crepidogaster insularis Deuve & Mateu, 1987
 Crepidogaster iturica (Basilewsky, 1959)
 Crepidogaster jocquei (Basilewsky, 1988)
 Crepidogaster kaboboensis (Basilewsky, 1988)
 Crepidogaster kahuziana (Basilewsky, 1988)
 Crepidogaster kavanaughi Deuve, 2005
 Crepidogaster kivuensis Basilewsky, 1949
 Crepidogaster kochi Basilewsky, 1959
 Crepidogaster kundelunguana (Basilewsky, 1959)
 Crepidogaster langenhani (Liebke, 1927)
 Crepidogaster lateralis Basilewsky, 1949
 Crepidogaster laticollis (Basilewsky, 1959)
 Crepidogaster leleupi Basilewsky, 1953  
 Crepidogaster longilineata (Basilewsky, 1988)
 Crepidogaster louwerensi Basilewsky, 1959
 Crepidogaster luberoensis (Basilewsky, 1988)
 Crepidogaster madecassa (Fairmaire, 1901)
 Crepidogaster malawica (Basilewsky, 1988)
 Crepidogaster marginicollis Barker, 1919
 Crepidogaster mateui Deuve, 2005
 Crepidogaster matonga Barker, 1919
 Crepidogaster methneri Liebke, 1934
 Crepidogaster monticola (Basilewsky, 1988)
 Crepidogaster muhavurae (Basilewsky, 1988)
 Crepidogaster namaqua Basilewsky, 1988
 Crepidogaster natalensis Peringuey, 1896  
 Crepidogaster natalica Peringuey, 1896
 Crepidogaster neglecta Basilewsky, 1959
 Crepidogaster nonstriata Chaudoir, 1876
 Crepidogaster notulatipennis Peringuey, 1896
 Crepidogaster nyakagerana (Basilewsky, 1988)
 Crepidogaster oblata Basilewsky, 1988
 Crepidogaster occidentalis (Basilewsky, 1968)
 Crepidogaster oldeanica (Basilewsky, 1959)
 Crepidogaster orophila (Basilewsky, 1988)
 Crepidogaster ovicollis Chaudoir, 1876
 Crepidogaster pauliani Basilewsky, 1953
 Crepidogaster penrithae Basilewsky, 1988
 Crepidogaster peyrierasi Deuve & Mateu, 1987
 Crepidogaster phallica (Basilewsky, 1988)
 Crepidogaster picipennis Chaudoir, 1876
 Crepidogaster plagata Basilewsky, 1988
 Crepidogaster portentosa Peringuey, 1899
 Crepidogaster posticalis Peringuey, 1896
 Crepidogaster protuberata Basilewsky, 1959
 Crepidogaster reducta Basilewsky, 1959
 Crepidogaster ruandana (Basilewsky, 1988)
 Crepidogaster rufescens (Motschulsky, 1862)
 Crepidogaster ruwenzorica (Basilewsky, 1988)
 Crepidogaster sambesiaca Liebke, 1934
 Crepidogaster sansibarica Liebke, 1934
 Crepidogaster schroederi Liebke, 1934
 Crepidogaster somalica Basilewsky, 1988
 Crepidogaster specicola (Basilewsky, 1988)
 Crepidogaster straneoi Basilewsky, 1959
 Crepidogaster subovicollis (Basilewsky, 1988)
 Crepidogaster swazica (Basilewsky, 1988)
 Crepidogaster tendiculata Basilewsky, 1988
 Crepidogaster transvaalensis (Basilewsky, 1992)
 Crepidogaster venusta (Basilewsky, 1988)

References

Brachininae